Dench is an English surname which may refer to:

Charles Dench (1873–1958), English cricketer and umpire
David Dench (born 1951), former Australian rules footballer, father of Michelle Dench
Doug Dench (1930–2012), Australian rules footballer
Emma Dench, English ancient historian, classicist, and academic administrator
Geoff Dench (1940–2018), British social scientist
Ian Dench (born 1964), English songwriter and musician
Jeffery Dench (1928–2014), English actor, older brother of Judi Dench
Judi Dench (born 1934), English actress
Michelle Dench, Australian sportswoman
Patricia Dench (born 1932), Australian sports shooter
Peter Dench (born 1972), English photojournalist
Rosemarie Dench (born Rosemarie Stewart, 1914–2001), English pair skater
Sacha Dench, Australian biologist, conservationist and adventurer
William Dench (christened 1797), English cricketer

See also 
Ethel Dench Puffer Howes (1872–1950), American psychologist and feminist organizer